The 2018–19 GET-ligaen was the 80th season of Norway's premier ice hockey league, GET-ligaen.

The regular season began on 8 September 2018, and was concluded on March 5, 2019.

The playoffs to determine the 2019 Norwegian Ice Hockey Champions began March 7, and ended April 15, 2019.

Participating teams

Team changes
After finishing second in the qualification for the 2018-19 season, Ringerike Panthers qualified for the GET-liga, replacing Kongsvinger Knights who finished fourth.
Due to long-term economic problems, Lørenskog IK failed to receive a professional license to play in the GET-liga. The vacant spot was offered first to Narvik IK, then to Kongsvinger Knights, who both declined the spot.

Arenas 
Since Nye Jordal Amfi will not be completed until the 2020–21 season, Vålerenga used Furuset Forum as a temporary arena the whole season.

Lillehammer repeated their Winter Classic match in Håkons Hall from the 2017-18 season against Storhamar. The match was played on November 17, 2018.

Manglerud Star played a home match against Storhamar Hockey in the Gjøvik Olympic Cavern Hall. The match was played on October 29, 2018.

Coaching changes

Regular season

Standings 
Updated as of March 5, 2019.
x – clinched playoff spot; y – clinched regular season league title; r – play in relegation series

Source: hockey.no

Statistics

Scoring leaders 

List shows the ten best skaters based on the number of points during the regular season. If two or more skaters are tied (i.e. same number of points, goals and played games), all of the tied skaters are shown. Updated as of September 7, 2018.

GP = Games played; G = Goals; A = Assists; Pts = Points; +/– = Plus/Minus; PIM = Penalty Minutes

Source: hockey.no

Leading goaltenders 
The top five goaltenders based on goals against average. Updated as of September 7, 2018.

Source: hockey.no

Attendance 

Source:hockey.no

Playoffs 
After the regular season, the top eight teams qualified for the playoffs. In the first and second rounds, the highest remaining seed chose which of the two lowest remaining seeds to be matched against. In each round the higher-seeded team was awarded home ice advantage. Each best-of-seven series followed a 1–1–1–1–1–1–1 format: the higher-seeded team played at home for games 1 and 3 (plus 5 and 7 if necessary), and the lower-seeded team at home for games 2, 4 and 6 (if necessary).

Bracket
Updated as of April 13, 2019.

Source: hockey.no

Qualification 
After the regular season has ended, the lowest ranked team in the league and the two highest ranked teams in the 1. divisjon will compete for the right to play in the 2019–20 GET-ligaen. The tournament will be organized according to a double round robin format, where each club plays the others twice, home and away, for a total of six games. The points system and ranking method used, will be the same as in the GET-ligaen.

Standings
Updated as of March 21, 2019.

q – qualified for next years GET-league; r – will play in next years 1. division

Source: hockey.no

References

External links 
  

2018-19
Nor
GET-ligaen